Sharptooth is an American hardcore punk band from Baltimore, Maryland, United States.  The ensemble has released an EP called Chompers and two studio albums, entitled Clever Girl and Transitional Forms.

History 
In May 2017, Sharptooth signed to Pure Noise Records.  The label features other bands such as Knocked Loose, Senses Fail, and Less Than Jake.

In early 2018, the ensemble toured with Anti-Flag, Stray from the Path and The White Noise.  In May 2018, they then went on to tour with Senses Fail. In mid-2018, the ensemble performed on every date of the last full US run of the Vans Warped Tour.  The quintet also opened for the first Cane Hill headlining tour in late 2018, and supported As It Is in early 2019.

In April 2019, the ensemble recorded their second studio album, and travelled Europe with rock bands Comeback Kid, No Turning Back and Jesus Piece.  Once their tour in the Eastern Hemisphere was complete, it was followed in May 2019 by four concerts in Canada with Boundaries, Sudden Waves, Harriers and Cold Shoulder all supporting Canadian metal group Obey the Brave.

In September 2019, the quintet returned to Canada to perform alongside Canadian punk rock bands Single Mothers and Cancer Bats, and stated that they were working on their second studio album.  In November, the band released singles "Mean Brain" and "Die for the Government", the latter being featured on Hopeless Records compilation album Songs That Saved My Life Vol. 2.

In May 2020, the group published "Say Nothing (In The Absence Of Content)", the first music video for Transitional Forms, their second studio album, released on 9 July 2020.  Almost one month later, the ensemble released "The Gray", another single from their upcoming album.

On July 10, 2020, the band released their sophomore album, Transitional Forms. The day before the band also released a music video for their new song "Evolution (ft. Justin Sane from Anti-Flag)" premiering on revolvermag.com

On August 28, 2022, Lauren Kashan made an announcement on Instagram informing fans she had left the band over a year prior, citing a negative work environment and inability to self-express. The band responded on Instagram, saying they "will not be performing any songs written while Lauren was in the band", and that they are taking "a new direction." On August 31, 2022, the band made an announcement introducing Marissa Ward, former vocalist of beatdown hardcore band Backswing, as their new vocalist, while also announcing that they released a new single "I Didn't Ask to Be Here", that same day.

Critical reception 
Vince Bellino of Decibel magazine stated that the group has "earned a reputation up and down the east coast for their fierce political message and chaotic live shows".

Metal Injection reviewed Clever Girl as "10/10" and referred to the album as "an explosive hardcore record that packs tons of aggressive blends of sound, and shows off lots of impressive techniques in the instrumental playing" as well as "an educational experience: for the things happening around us, the fears we’ve never had to experience, or the issues we may have not even been aware of".

Metal Hammer named Transitional Forms as the 39th best metal album of 2020.

Members

Current members 
 Marissa Ward - vocals
 Keith Higgins - guitars
 Lance Donati - guitars
 Matthew Ryan - drums

Former members 
 Lauren Kashan - vocals
 Peter Bruno - bass
 Phil Rasinski - bass
 Conor MacNamara - drums
 Josh Hursey - drums
 Jake Drnec - bass

Discography

Studio albums 
 Clever Girl (2017)
 Transitional Forms (2020)

EPs 
 Below The Docks (2014)
 Chompers (2015)
 Imperfect Animal (2022)

Videos 
 "Clever Girl" (2017)
 "Fuck You Donald Trump" (2017)
 "No Sanctuary" (2018)
 "Mean Brain" (2019)
 "Say Nothing (In The Absence Of Content)" (2020)
 "Evolution (ft. Justin Sane from Anti-Flag)" (2020)

Singles 
 "Die for the Government" (2019)
 "The Gray" (2020)

References 

Hardcore punk groups from Maryland
Heavy metal musical groups from Maryland
Musical groups from Baltimore
Metalcore musical groups from Maryland